The 2017–18 season will be Crawley Town's 122nd season in their history and their third consecutive season in League Two. Along with League Two, the club will also compete in the FA Cup, EFL Cup and EFL Trophy.

The season covers the period from 1 July 2017 to 30 June 2018.

Players

First team squad

New contracts

Transfers

In

Out

Loans in

Loans out

Pre-season
As of 22 June 2017, Crawley Town have announced seven pre-season fixtures against Brighton & Hove Albion, East Grinstead Town, Dulwich Hamlet, Bognor Regis Town, Oakwood, Chelsea XI and Portsmouth.

Competitions

Overview

{| class="wikitable" style="text-align: center"
|-
!rowspan=2|Competition
!colspan=8|Record
|-
!
!
!
!
!
!
!
!
|-
| League Two

|-
| FA Cup

|-
| EFL Cup

|-
| EFL Trophy

|-
! Total

League Two

League table

Results summary

Results by matchday

Matches

The fixtures for the 2017–18 season were announced on 21 June 2017 at 9am.

FA Cup

EFL Cup

On 16 June 2017, Crawley Town were drawn away to Birmingham City in the first round.

EFL Trophy

On 12 July 2017, Crawley Town were drawn in Southern Group A against Charlton Athletic, Fulham U23s and Portsmouth.

Sussex Senior Cup

Statistics

Appearances

Top scorers
The list is sorted by shirt number when total goals are equal.

Clean sheets
The list is sorted by shirt number when total appearances are equal.

Summary

References

Crawley Town F.C. seasons
Crawley Town